Bruce Wong (born Tung Soon Wong) was a Chinese American character actor, filmmaker, and restaurateur who worked in Hollywood in the 1930s and 1940s.

Biography

Early life 
Bruce was born in Los Angeles as Tung Soon Wong to parents who had immigrated to Southern California from China. One of his brothers, Beal Wong, also became an actor.

Behind the camera 
In 1936, after raising money in San Francisco he made a nine-reel film—Sum Yun (aka Heartaches)—for the Chinese market, sensing a real opportunity. The Cantonese-language film starred Wai Kim, and was filmed in California under Wong's Cathay Pictures production company during a six-day shoot. Wong served as producer, and the film was directed by Frank Tang.

Acting roles 
Plans to make subsequent films never came to fruition, and he turned to acting instead. He appeared in a long list of films between 1937 and 1950, mostly in background roles.

Personal 
Wong was married to Genevieve; the pair had several children together. In addition to his work in Hollywood, Wong also owned and operated at least two restaurants in Los Angeles: Chinese Village Cafe, at 745 N. Main St., and the Ming Room, at 358 S. La Cienega Blvd. Chinese Village Cafe was sold right before Wong's death in November 1953.

Selected filmography 
As producer:

 Sum Yun (1936)

As actor:

 Appointment with Danger (1950)
 Nob Hill (1945)
 The Purple Heart (1944)
 Up in Arms (1944)
 Destination Tokyo (1943)
 Jack London (1943) 
 Behind the Rising Sun (1943)
 We've Never Been Licked (1943) 
 Crash Dive (1943)
 Time to Kill (1942)
 Busses Roar (1942)
 Submarine Raider (1942)
 Song of the Islands (1942)
 The Mystery of Mr. Wong (1939)
 North of Shanghai (1939)
 International Settlement (1938)
 Daughter of Shanghai (1937)
 West of Shanghai (1937)
 Devil's Playground (1937)

References 

American male film actors
American film producers
1909 births
Male actors from Los Angeles
American male actors of Chinese descent
1953 deaths